Granite Mountain Air Station  is a private airport located in Granite Mountain, Alaska, USA.

Facilities 
Granite Mountain Air Station has one runway:
 Runway 17/35: 3,871 x 111 ft. (1,180 x 34 m), Surface: Gravel

References 
 
 Great Circle Mapper: GMT - Granite Mountain, Alaska (Granite Mountain Air Station)

External links 
 Resources for this airport:
 
 
 

Airports in the Nome Census Area, Alaska